Andrés San Martín (born 12 April 1978 in Lomas de Zamora, Buenos Aires) is an Argentine retired footballer who played as a midfielder.

Club career
San Martín began his career in 1997 at second division club Club Atlético Banfield. Two years later, he moved to the top flight with Unión de Santa Fe. Meanwhile, his former team had won promotion to that level and, in 2002, the player rejoined Banfield.

In 2005, San Martín left Banfield for Club Atlético River Plate at the Estadio Monumental. After one season, he was loaned out to Spanish club CD Tenerife, in Segunda División, with the Canary Islands team having an option to buy at the season's closure. However, in December 2006, he was released, returning to his country, still on loan, with Arsenal de Sarandí.

At the end of the loan period, San Martín signed on a permanent basis, for the beginning of the Apertura 2008 tournament. In early 2009, he returned to River Plate for a second spell. After one season with the club, he was released and subsequently hired by third division's Sportivo Italiano.

Honours

References

External links
 Argentine League statistics  
 
 FootballLineups profile

1978 births
Living people
People from Lomas de Zamora
Argentine people of Spanish descent
Argentine footballers
Association football midfielders
Argentine Primera División players
Club Atlético Banfield footballers
Unión de Santa Fe footballers
Club Atlético River Plate footballers
Arsenal de Sarandí footballers
Segunda División players
CD Tenerife players
Argentine expatriate footballers
Expatriate footballers in Spain
Sportspeople from Buenos Aires Province